Neil Ormandy (born April 1, 1981) is a British musician, songwriter and producer based in Los Angeles. He co-wrote James Arthur's worldwide hit single "Say You Won't Let Go" and is the co-owner of SILO: Music.

Early life
Ormandy was born and raised in Manchester, England.

Career

Rushmore
When he was 18 years old, Ormandy formed Rushmore, an indie country/pop band, with his older brother Ed Ormandy. They were signed to a publishing deal with EMI in 2000, and a record deal with Kinetic Records in 2001. In 2005, Paul Adam at Island Records signed Rushmore to a development deal, which led to Rushmore signing a record deal with Mercury Records the following year. The band toured with artists including Keith Urban, Simply Red, James Morrison and Paolo Nutini.

Songwriting
Ormandy moved to Los Angeles in 2009, signing writer-producer deals with Pusher, District Music, Archangel and HTGR, where he began writing music for television, film and advertising campaigns.

In 2014, Ormandy signed a publishing deal with Ultra Music, and launched SILO: Music, which he runs with his brother Jack Ormandy. The company specializes in creating music for television shows, films, film trailers and commercials and managing a collection of top notch pop songwriters and producers. SILO: Music has had songs on television shows including CSI: Crime Scene Investigation; CSI: NY; Arrow; Gotham; Silicon Valley; Nikita; Teen Wolf; and motion picture trailer cues for Clash of the Titans; Green Lantern; Knight and Day; Dead Man Down; The Girl With the Dragon Tattoo; Selma; The Avengers; and the official trailer for Rogue One: A Star Wars Story. 

Ormandy co-wrote James Arthur's 2016 single "Say You Won't Let Go", which was a number 1 single in the United Kingdom, Sweden, Australia, Ireland, New Zealand and the Netherlands. In the US, it reached number 11 on the Billboard Hot 100 and number 1 on the Adult Top 40 chart. Currently "Say You Won't Let Go" is the number 11 most streamed songs on Spotify with over 1 billion streams to date.

In 2017 he wrote the single "Breathe" by Eric Prydz featuring Rob Swire, which reached number 27 on the Billboard Dance chart.

In 2018 he co-wrote on three tracks of the Welshly Arms sophomore album No Place Is Home and collaborated with beloved winner of the 2016 America's Got Talent, Grace VanderWaal, on her single “Clearly.” Thus far 2019 has seen the release of Ormandy's co-write on “Girl in the Mirror” by Bebe Rexha from the feature film UglyDolls and the third single of the Dean Lewis debut album, “Stay Awake” which peaked at number 20 on Billboard US Adult Top 40.

Other collaborations include Nick Jonas, Kelly Clarkson, Zara Larsson, Dermot Kennedy, Calum Scott, Alesso, Trippie Redd, Aloe Blacc, Jamie Cullum, Hey Violet, Barns Courtney, Sasha Sloan, Cheat Codes, and Tom Grennan.

Discography

Writing and producing credits

References

External links 
 SILO Music website
 

1981 births
Living people
British emigrants to the United States
British songwriters
British record producers
Musicians from Manchester
Musicians from Los Angeles
Songwriters from California